A kantar is the official Egyptian weight unit for measuring cotton.  It corresponds to the US hundredweight, and is roughly equal to 99.05 pounds, or 45.02 kilograms.  It is equal to either 157 kilograms of seed cotton or 50 kilograms of lint cotton.

References

Units of mass